Norcan Lake is a reservoir lake in the municipality of North Frontenac, Frontenac County in Eastern Ontario, Canada. It is on the Madawaska River system, is part of the Saint Lawrence River drainage basin, and is located in geographic townships of North Canonto Township and South Canonto Township.

The lake was formed when land flooded upon the completion of the Barrett Chute dam and generating station in 1943.

Tributaries
Clockwise from the mouth

Reddys Creek
Norcan Creek
Juniper Creek
Madawaska River

See also
List of lakes in Ontario

References

Other map sources:

Lakes of Frontenac County
Lakes of Renfrew County